Julie McGuire is an American politician serving as a member of the Indiana Senate from the 93rd district. She assumed office on November 22, 2022.

Career 
McGuire earned a bachelor's degree from Indiana University. She was involved in the Perry Township GOP Club prior to her election. She defeated incumbent John Jacob in the Republican primary prior to winning the general election.

Personal life 
McGuire was born in Indianapolis, Indiana. She and her husband, Mark, have four children.

References 

Republican Party Indiana state senators
Year of birth missing (living people)
Living people
21st-century American politicians
21st-century American women politicians
Politicians from Indianapolis
Indiana University alumni